Greenville Classical Academy is a private, classical, K–12 Christian school in Simpsonville, South Carolina. GCA was established in 2004. It serves approximately 200 students beginning at K4 and continuing through 12th grade. It is a member of the Association of Classical and Christian Schools, Christian Schools International, and the National Association of University-Model Schools. It is accredited by the Association of Christian Schools International.

References

External links

Christian schools in South Carolina
Classical Christian schools
Schools in Greenville County, South Carolina
Simpsonville, South Carolina
Educational institutions established in 2004
2004 establishments in South Carolina